This is a list of series released by TVB in 2008.

Top ten drama series in ratings
The following is a list of TVB's top serial dramas in 2008 by average ratings. The list includes premiere week and final week ratings, as well as the average overall count of live Hong Kong viewers (in millions).

Awards

First line series
These dramas air in Hong Kong from 8:00pm to 8:30pm, Monday to Friday on TVB.

Second line series
These dramas air in Hong Kong from 8:30pm to 9:30pm, Monday to Friday on TVB.

Third line series
These dramas air in Hong Kong from 9:30pm to 10:30pm, Monday to Friday on TVB.

Weekend Dramas

Saturday series
These dramas aired in Hong Kong from 10:30pm to 11:00pm, Saturday on TVB.

References

External links
  TVB.com

2008
2008 in Hong Kong television